Alba is a Spanish drama television series produced by Atresmedia and Boomerang TV, consisting of an adaptation of the Turkish series Fatmagül'ün Suçu Ne?. It premiered on Atresplayer Premium on 28 March 2021.

Premise 
The series is set in the Marina Baixa. Alba, a student at the university in Madrid, is in a relationship there with Bruno, a young man from her hometown. One night, after returning to her hometown for the holidays, she is the victim of a gang rape and wakes up on the beach in the morning with no memory of the event. Alba soon learns that the three male perpetrators are Bruno's best friends, and that Bruno was also on the scene during the crime. Seeking justice, Alba and Bruno must resist pressure and threats from the wealthy and powerful Entrerríos family.

Cast

Production and release 
Alba is an adaptation of the popular Turkish series Fatmagül'ün Suçu Ne?, known as Fatmagül in Spain. Coproduced by Atresmedia and Grupo Boomerang, it consists of 13 episodes with a running time of roughly 50 minutes. The scriptwriting team was formed by Irma Correa, Javier Holgado, Ignasi Rubio and Carlos Martín. Filming began in June 2020. Shooting locations included the Madrid region, Villajoyosa and other cities in the Costa Blanca such as Benidorm and Finestrat. The 6-month-long filming wrapped by December 2020. Atresmedia set the date of the premiere for 28 March 2021. Netflix acquired the series in 2022 and released it on 15 July.

References 

Atresplayer Premium original programming
2020s Spanish drama television series
Non-Turkish television series based on Turkish television series
Rape in television
Television shows filmed in Spain
Television shows set in the Valencian Community
Spanish television series based on non-Spanish television series
Spanish-language television shows
2021 Spanish television series debuts
Television series by Boomerang TV